The French Athletics Federation ( - FFA), is the governing body for the sport of athletics in France.

History
FFA is the heir to the Union des Sociétés Françaises de Sports Athlétiques (USFSA), founded November 20, 1887. In 1912, a French delegation was present at the conference in Stockholm that founded the International Association of Athletics Federations (IAAF) with 17 national federations.

Organisation
The French Athletics Federation is governed by a president and seven vice-presidents, a general secretary, and a general treasurer.

Board
President: Bernard Amsalem
General secretary: Doris Spira

Kit suppliers
France's kits are currently supplied by Asics.

See also
Athletics in France
Union des Sociétés Françaises de Sports Athlétiques
French records in athletics

References

External links
  Official site

France
Athletics
Athletics in France
National governing bodies for athletics
Sports organizations established in 1920